Newton Falls Reservoir is a man-made lake located by Newton Falls, New York. Fish species present in the reservoir are smallmouth bass, northern pike, brown bullhead, rock bass, yellow perch, and white sucker. There is carry down access on the lake with permission from Reliant Energy.

References 

Lakes of St. Lawrence County, New York
Reservoirs in New York (state)